Mahammadpur is a village in the Siwan district of Bihar, India.

Government 
Mahammadpur is represented by a Sarpanch, who is elected by the people of the village and has judicial powers to punish and impose fines.

Geography 
It has an average elevation of 223 metres (223 feet).

References 

Villages in Siwan district